Raoul Gehringer (1971–2018) was a choir director and composer. His compositions include The Tale of Moby Dick, first performed by the Vienna Boys Choir in 2004.

References

External links
https://web.archive.org/web/20150619121520/http://www.tonkunst.at/CVS/Seite20.htm (in German)

Austrian male composers
Austrian composers
1971 births
2018 deaths